The following is a list of Brazilian highways, sorted by jurisdiction and official number designation.

List of highways

Federal highways

Federal District

Radial highways

North-south highways

East-west highways

Diagonal highways

Connecting roads

Acre

Alagoas

Amapá

Amazonas

Bahia

Radial highways

North-south highways

East-west highways

Link highways

Highway branches

Ceará

Espírito Santo

Radial highways

North-south highways

East-west highways

Diagonal highways

Link highways

Goiás

Radial highways

North-south highways

East-west highways

Diagonal highways

Link highways

Highway branches

Maranhão

Mato Grosso

Mato Grosso do Sul

Minas Gerais

Pará

Paraíba

Pernambuco

Paraná

Permanent highways

Coincident highways

Access highways

Temporary highways

Piaui

Rio de Janeiro

Rio Grande do Norte

Rio Grande do Sul

Rondônia

Roraima

Santa Catarina

Sergipe

São Paulo

Tocantins

Territory of Fernando de Noronha

References 

Departamento Nacional de Infraestrutura de Transportes. Mapa multimodal do Pará.  Acesso em 6 fev 2012.
*Composição da Malha Rodoviária Estadual  Departamento de Estradas de Rodagem do Paraná (DER-PR) - página visitada em 22 de abril de 2014*Departamento de Estradas de Rodagem do Estado de Pernambuco Departamento de Estradas de Rodagem do Estado de Pernambuco

*CARVALHO, Carlos Augusto Matos. Análise estrutural do setor de transporte rodoviário de cargas do Município de Boa Vista. UFRGS: 2010. Acesso em 11 fev 2012.

External links
 Road maps of the Ministry of Transport

Highways
Brazil
Highways
Highways